The 2016 Sunshine Ladies Tour was the 3rd season of the Sunshine Ladies Tour, a series of professional golf tournaments for women based in  South Africa.

Schedule
The season consisted of 9 events, all held in South Africa, played between November and March.

Order of Merit
This shows the leaders in the final Order of Merit.

Source:

References

External links
Official homepage of the Sunshine Ladies Tour

Sunshine Ladies Tour
Sunshine Ladies Tour